Gary John Heale (born 15 July 1958) is a former English professional footballer who played for teams in England, the Netherlands, and the United States.

Heale began his career in 1975 with Canvey Island. In 1978, he moved to Luton Town. After only one season, he was transferred to Reading, where he played until 1982. That year, he moved to Sparta Rotterdam in the Netherlands for the 1982–83 season. In 1983, he moved to the San Diego Sockers of the North American Soccer League. In the fall of 1983, he signed with the Tacoma Stars of the Major Indoor Soccer League. In 1987, he moved to the Los Angeles Lazers, then to St. Louis Storm. In 1988, he spent one season with the Seattle Storm in the Western Soccer League and the Seattle Sounders of the A-League. In 1994, he signed with the Seattle Sounders in the A-League.

He was the head coach of the Washington Premier FC Academy in Tacoma, Washington alongside Jimmy McAlister. They coached the team to the USSF National Finals taking fifth place. In 2018 he was named head coach of Premier Development League side Wake FC. He is also a coach in their youth program.

References

External links
 1995 Seattle Sounders Media Guide
 MISL stats

1958 births
Living people
Association football forwards
English footballers
English expatriate footballers
Eredivisie players
Expatriate footballers in the Netherlands
Expatriate soccer players in the United States
Seattle Storm (soccer) players
Los Angeles Lazers players
Luton Town F.C. players
Major Indoor Soccer League (1978–1992) players
North American Soccer League (1968–1984) players
Reading F.C. players
San Diego Sockers (NASL) players
Seattle Sounders (1994–2008) players
Sparta Rotterdam players
St. Louis Storm players
Tacoma Stars players
Western Soccer Alliance players
Canvey Island F.C. players
Grays Athletic F.C. players
English expatriate sportspeople in the Netherlands
English expatriate sportspeople in the United States